is a railway station in the town of Tsunan, Nakauonuma District, Niigata Prefecture, Japan operated by East Japan Railway Company (JR East).

Lines
Tsunan Station is served by the Iiyama Line, and is 57.9 kilometers from the starting point of the line at Toyono Station.

Station layout
The station consists of one side platform serving a single bi-directional track. The station building is staffed, and includes an onsen public bath on its second story.

History
It was renamed to its present name on 1 October 1968. With the privatization of Japanese National Railways (JNR) on 1 April 1987, the station came under the control of JR East.

Passenger statistics
In fiscal 2017, the station was used by an average of 525 passengers daily (boarding passengers only).

Surrounding area

See also
 List of railway stations in Japan

References

External links

 JR East station information 

Railway stations in Niigata Prefecture
Iiyama Line
Railway stations in Japan opened in 1927
Tsunan, Niigata